Calogero Lo Giudice (16 June 1938 – 24 August 2021) was an Italian politician who served as President of Sicily and Member of the European Parliament.

References

1938 births
2021 deaths
Italian politicians
Presidents of Sicily
MEPs for Italy 1989–1994
Christian Democracy (Italy) politicians
Members of the Sicilian Regional Assembly
People from Enna